The Memorial Oleg Dyachenko is a one-day road cycling race held annually in Moscow, Russia. It was first run in 2004 and since 2005 has been part of the UCI Europe Tour as a 1.2 category race.

Past winners

External links

UCI Europe Tour races
Recurring sporting events established in 2004
Cycle races in Russia
2004 establishments in Russia
Sports competitions in Moscow